Richard Bonehill (c. 1948 – 4 February 2015) was a British actor and stuntman with an expertise in swordsmanship.

Career

He played a number of different character extras in The Empire Strikes Back and Return of the Jedi, most notably the alien Nien Nunb, a Stormtrooper, Tie Fighter pilot and more. Other films he worked on included Flash Gordon and Highlander. His television credits included Doctor Who.

Bonehill was also a competitive fencer and fencing coach. He was crowned 2010 Veterans World Sabre Champion at the 14th World Veterans Fencing Championships held in Croatia. Before the final he was presented with a commemorative diploma from the Fédération Internationale d'Escrime, the world governing body of fencing, to mark his 'extraordinary achievement' of representing Great Britain at 10 consecutive World Championships.

Bonehill died on 4 February 2015. He was 67.

Filmography

Film

Television

References

External links

 Richard Bonehill BFI

1949 births
2015 deaths
British stunt performers
British male fencers
20th-century British male actors